David Barrie (born December 12, 1980) is a Canadian professional soccer referee, and is a member of the Professional Referee Organization. He officiates in Major League Soccer, USL Championship, and USL League One in the United States and in the Canadian Premier League in Canada.

Career 
Barrie began officiating at the youth level with the Bedfordshire FA, while he was in Luton, England with his family. In 2006, he was licensed by the Ontario Soccer Association, and began referring matches in the Canadian Soccer League (CSL) in 2009. In 2010, he was selected for the Canadian Soccer Association National List of Match Officials. In 2011, he was named the CSL Referee Year, and received the award once more the following year. In 2014, he officiated the CIS Championship final. 

He made his North American Soccer League match official debut on May 1, 2011 in a match with FC Edmonton against Montreal Impact. In 2014, he began officiating matches in the Canadian Championship, and in the USL Championship in 2017. In 2017, he became involved in Major League Soccer as a fourth official. In 2019, he was assigned matches in the Canadian Premier League as a match official.

References 

1980 births
Living people
Sportspeople from Brampton
Canadian soccer referees
North American Soccer League referees
Soccer people from Ontario